City Primary School on Krasnoyarskaya Street is a building in Zheleznodorozhny City District of Novosibirsk, Russia. It was built in 1911. Architect: Andrey Kryachkov. The building is located on the corner of Krasnoyarskaya and 1905 Year streets.

History
The City Primary School was constructed by architect Andrey Kryachkov in 1911. It was ordered by the first city head Vladimir Zhernakov.

Gallery

See also
 City Primary School on Lenin Street

References

External links
  Памятники истории, архитектуры и монументального искусства Новосибирской области.

Zheleznodorozhny City District, Novosibirsk
Buildings and structures in Novosibirsk
School buildings completed in 1911
1911 establishments in the Russian Empire
Cultural heritage monuments of regional significance in Novosibirsk Oblast